{{DISPLAYTITLE:C30H44O9}}
The molecular formula C30H44O9 (molar mass: 548.66 g/mol, exact mass: 548.2985 u) may refer to:

 Cymarin
 Peruvoside, or cannogenin thevetoside

Molecular formulas